Stefanovouno is a village and a community of the Elassona municipality. Before 1927 the village was known as Aradosivia Zeinel Mahale(Greek: Αραδοσίβια Ζεϊνέλ). Until the exchange of populations in 1924 and the arrival of the refugees from Pontus, the village was inhabited by local Greeks and local Muslims. Before the 2011 local government reform it was part of the municipality of Elassona, of which it was a municipal district. The 2011 census recorded 487 inhabitants in the village and 495 in the community. The community of Stefanovouno covers an area of 37.79 km2.

Administrative division
The community of Stefanovouno consists of two separate settlements: 
Lefki 
Stefanovouno

Population
According to the 2011 census, the population of the settlement of Stefanovouno was 487 people, a decrease of almost 18% compared to that of the previous census of 2001.

See also
 List of settlements in the Larissa regional unit

References

Populated places in Larissa (regional unit)